Karula (formerly: Uue-Võidu) is a village in Viljandi Parish, Viljandi County, Estonia. It has a population of 197 (as of 1 January 2010).

Politicians Jüri Jaakson (1870–1942) and Jüri Parik (1889–1929) were born in Karula.

References

Villages in Viljandi County
Kreis Fellin